Presidential elections were held in Indonesia on 8 July 2009. The elections returned a president and vice president for the 2009–2014 term. Incumbent President Susilo Bambang Yudhoyono, elected with a 20% margin in the 2004 election, sought a second term against former President Megawati Sukarnoputri in a rematch of the 2004 election, as well as incumbent Vice President Jusuf Kalla. Securing a majority of the votes in a landslide victory in the first round, Yudhoyono was re-elected without the need to proceed to a second round, scheduled to be held on 8 September if no candidate received a majority of the popular vote. Yudhoyono was officially declared the victor of the election on 23 July 2009, by the General Election Commission (KPU). At the time of his re-election victory, Yudhoyono, with nearly 74 million votes in his favour, held the record for the highest number of votes for a single person in any democratic election in history. His record was surpassed by his successor Joko Widodo who won 85 million votes in 2019.

Background
This was the second election in which Indonesians elected their President and Vice President directly. In 2004, Susilo Bambang Yudhoyono defeated incumbent Megawati Sukarnoputri in a run-off election. Polls through early January 2009 saw Yudhoyono leading a large field of potential presidential candidates.

Incumbent Vice President Jusuf Kalla announced in February 2009 that he would not be returning as a vice presidential candidate with Yudhoyono. Instead, he was ready to challenge Yudhoyono should Golkar, the party which he chaired, nominate him as a presidential candidate. Other individuals interested in becoming presidential candidates included former President Abdurrahman Wahid, former People's Representative Council (DPR) Speaker Akbar Tandjung,  Yogyakarta Sultan Hamengkubuwana X, and former Jakarta Governor Sutiyoso.

On 17 February, the Constitutional Court ruled that independent candidates would not be allowed to run in the election.

Coalition talks
Following legislative elections held on 9 April, coalitions of political parties began to emerge in order to nominate candidates for President and Vice President. Under the 2008 Presidential Election Law, the candidates must be nominated by a party or coalition that won at least 25% of the popular vote or 112 (20%) of 560 seats of the DPR. Indonesia's Constitutional Court also ruled that independent candidates would not be allowed to run. Candidates had to officially register with the KPU by midnight of 16 May in order to appear on the ballots.

It initially appeared that Golkar, the party of incumbent Vice President Jusuf Kalla, would enter into a coalition with the Indonesian Democratic Party of Struggle (PDI–P) of former president Megawati Sukarnoputri to challenge President Susilo Bambang Yudhoyono's Democratic Party. However, talks were broken off on 13 April 2009, with Golkar reportedly more interested in continuing the coalition with Yudhoyono rather than risk being cut off from power completely. Yudhoyono was also in talks with Islamist parties in a bid to form a coalition controlling more than half the seats in parliament.

By late April 2009, Golkar was in talks with smaller parties to gain the votes it lacked to be able to nominate Kalla as a presidential candidate. A ten-party coalition was formed on 1 May, consisting of Golkar, PDI–P, the Great Indonesia Movement Party (Gerindra), the People's Conscience Party (Hanura), the Prosperous Peace Party (PDS), the Reform Star Party (PBR), the Ulema National Awakening Party (PKNU), the National People's Concern Party (PPRN), the Labor Party and the Indonesian Nahdlatul Community Party (PPNUI). Two parties who had been considering joining the coalition, the National Mandate Party (PAN) and the United Development Party (PPP), in the end, decided not to join. Shortly after the ten-party coalition was announced, incumbent Vice President Kalla announced a joint ticket with former Indonesian military leader Wiranto.

The PDI–P selected former president Megawati as its presidential candidate on 7 May but did not immediately announce a running mate. The possibility of Gerindra leader Prabowo Subianto becoming Megawati's running mate had been favoured by PDI–P leadership, but the two parties had yet to come to an agreement two days before the 16 May candidate registration deadline. After plans to announce the pair's candidacy were postponed to allow for continuing negotiations, both parties eventually declared on 15 May the nomination of Megawati and Prabowo as candidates for president and vice president.

In the scenario that either Kalla or Megawati would have lost his or her bid for the presidency in the first election round, one candidate would have supported the other in the second round, as agreed upon by the grand coalition formed to oppose incumbent President Yudhoyono.

On 12 May 2009, Yudhoyono chose Boediono, the governor of Bank Indonesia (Indonesia's central bank), as his running mate. Four parties which had planned to form a coalition with Yudhoyono's Democratic Party (PAN, PPP, the National Awakening Party (PKB), and the Prosperous Justice Party (PKS)) had expected that the vice presidential nominee would come from one of their parties. Although they threatened to form their own coalition with Gerindra and present their own candidate, PKB became the first party in the coalition to support Yudhoyono's decision. The remaining three parties eventually agreed to support the Yudhoyono–Boediono ticket and attended the nomination ceremony in Bandung on 15 May.

Candidates
Nominees for president and vice president registered their candidacy at the central KPU office in Jakarta on 16 May. Candidates underwent physical and psychological evaluations at Gatot Subroto Army Hospital following registration. Personality tests were also conducted using the Minnesota Multiphasic Personality Inventory.

Megawati Sukarnoputri and Prabowo Subianto
The pair of Megawati Sukarnoputri and Prabowo Subianto is referred to colloquially by the Indonesian media as Mega–Pro. These two candidates belong to opposing ideological backgrounds. Prabowo's father, Sumitro Djojohadikusumo, was a political enemy of Megawati's father, former President Sukarno.

Susilo Bambang Yudhoyono and Boediono
Initially, the pair of Susilo Bambang Yudhoyono and Boediono was referred to colloquially by the Indonesian media as SBY Berbudi. Three days after the slogan was announced, the campaign team had changed its name to SBY–Boediono due to concerns that the term berbudi was not as well known outside Java.

Jusuf Kalla and Wiranto
The pair of Jusuf Kalla and Wiranto is referred to colloquially by the Indonesian media as JK–Win.

Candidates

Schedule
Candidates had to register from 10–16 May, with medical checks, which they all passed, from 11–15 May. The candidates were officially announced on 28 May and drew their ballot numbers at the KPU building on 31 May. Megawati–Prabowo drew number 1, SBY–Boediono number 2 and Kalla–Wiranto number 3.

The presidential election campaign began on 2 June and ran until 4 July, with mass rallies allowed from 12 June onwards. Those participating in the campaign were not allowed to question the basis of the Indonesian state, insult the race or religion of candidates, use threats or violence or give financial or material incentives to voters. There were a series of debates between 18 June and 2 July that were carried live on Indonesian television, three between the presidential candidates and two between the vice-presidential candidates. The topics for these two-hour debates were agreed in advance, and by common consent, did not explicitly include human rights issues.

After a two-day "silent period", voting took place on 8 July. National election results are due to be announced between 27 and 29 July. Following a period to allow for legal challenges, the final results will be announced between 1 and 12 August. If the election goes to a second round, the second campaign period will run from 15 July – 7 September, with the vote on 8 September. The final result is due to be announced on 8 October, with the president and vice-president being sworn before the general session of the People's Consultative Assembly (MPR) in 20 October.

Results

By province

Quick count results

See also

 Elections in Indonesia

References

External links

  Official campaign site of Megawati Sukarnoputri and Prabowo Subianto
  Official campaign site of Susilo Bambang Yudhoyono
  Official campaign site of Jusuf Kalla and Wiranto
 Indonesian General Elections 2009 Web Archive from the U.S. Library of Congress

Indonesia
2009 elections in Indonesia
Presidential elections in Indonesia
Indonesia politics-related lists